Zipper (also known as Reckless) is a 2015 American political thriller film written and directed by Mora Stephens and starring Patrick Wilson, Lena Headey, Dianna Agron, Richard Dreyfuss, Ray Winstone, and Penelope Mitchell. The film had its world premiere on January 27, 2015 at the Sundance Film Festival. The film was released on August 28, 2015, in a limited release in the United States and through video on demand by Alchemy. The film follows a federal prosecutor running for office who cannot stop himself from sleeping with high-class escorts, putting both his career and his personal life at risk.

Plot
Sam Ellis is a man on the rise—a hot-shot prosecutor on the cusp of a bright future. When an intern at the office becomes infatuated with him, Sam unwisely attempts to quiet his desires by seeing a high-class escort—only to discover that the experience is more fulfilling and exhilarating than he could have imagined. A second appointment with an escort soon follows, and a third, sending his once idyllic life spiraling out of control. In the midst of wrestling with his demons, he suddenly finds himself being groomed to run for the Senate—thrusting him into the public spotlight, and forcing him to take increasingly dangerous measures to keep the press, the law, and his wife off his trail.

Cast
 Patrick Wilson as Sam Ellis
 Lena Headey as Jeannie Ellis
 Dianna Agron as Dalia
 Alexandra Breckenridge as Christy
 Penelope Mitchell as Laci / Jennifer
 Richard Dreyfuss as George Hiller
 Ray Winstone as Nigel Coaker
 John Cho as EJ
 Billy Slaughter as Sam's Aide
 Christopher McDonald as Peter Kirkland

Reception
Zipper has received negative reviews from critics, despite praise for Wilson's performance.  The review aggregator website Rotten Tomatoes reported a 20% rating, with a rating average of 4.38/10 based on 30 reviews. It has a score of 39% on Metacritic.

Jordan Hoffman of The Guardian gave the film 2/5 stars, saying, "What's ultimately frustrating about Zipper is that it seems like it has something important to say about infidelity and the sex industry, but can't decide what that should be." Kyle Smith of the New York Post called it a thinly veiled dramatization of the Eliot Spitzer prostitution scandal and gave the film a negative review, saying that "The movie comes across as a not particularly compelling episode of "House of Cards," and Wilson's Southern accent is equally unconvincing." David Rooney of The Hollywood Reporter also gave the film a negative review: "There's neither topicality nor bite in this bland pseudo-thriller, which lathers on composer H. Scott Salinas' high-suspense score like shower gel after sweaty sex, yet rarely musters an ounce of genuine tension." Another negative review from Geoff Berkshire of Variety said, "Tawdry but cripplingly self-serious, the second feature from Mora Stephens (a full decade after her little-seen, also politically themed debut Conventioneers) benefits from Patrick Wilson's committed star turn. Still, the awkward end product would inevitably struggle in theatrical venues, making it more advisable to play to the base and go straight to VOD and premium cable."

Despite having several negative reviews, Fred Topel from CraveOnline gave the film a positive review, with a score of 9.5/10, saying, "Zipper whips out the thrills… This year's Gone Girl… The grown-up thriller of the year."

Release
The film had its world premiere at the Sundance Film Festival on January 27, 2015. Shortly after it was announced Alchemy had acquired distribution rights to the film.
The film was released on August 28, 2015, in a limited release and through video on demand.

References

External links
 
 Zipper at Cargo Entertainment

2015 films
2015 independent films
2015 thriller drama films
American independent films
American political thriller films
American thriller drama films
Protozoa Pictures films
2015 drama films
2010s English-language films
2010s American films